The Baltimore Comets were a professional soccer team based in Baltimore, Maryland.  Founded in 1974, the Comets were an expansion team that played two seasons in the North American Soccer League.  The team originally played its home matches at Memorial Stadium but moved to Burdick Field located at Towson University during the 1975 season.  At the conclusion of the 1975 NASL season the team moved to San Diego, California rebranding as the Jaws.

History 
Looking to build off what was considered positive momentum in public interest in professional soccer, in January 1974 the North American Soccer League announced Baltimore as one of six cities awarded an expansion team for the upcoming 1974 season. Former Baltimore Bays head coach Doug Millward returned to the city to manage the team.  The Comets played their first game at home on May 4, 1974, at Memorial Stadium in Baltimore.  The team finished in second place in the Eastern Division qualifying for the playoffs as a wild card.  Peter Silvester, on loan from Southend United F.C. was named 1974 league MVP. On August 15, 1974, Baltimore lost 0–1 in the quarterfinals to the Boston Minutemen at Alumni Stadium.  The Comets participated in the 1975 NASL Indoor tournament as part of Region 3 playing at the Bayfront Center in St. Petersburg, Florida, and losing the two matches in which they played.

During the 1975 North American Soccer League season, the Comets were evicted from Memorial Stadium due to non-payment of rent and played the remaining part of the season at Burdick Field on the campus of Towson State University.  The team ended the season in last place in the Eastern Division with a record of 9 wins and 13 loses and an average attendance of 2,641, the lowest in the league.  Following the season, the team was sold and moved to San Diego.

Year-by-year

Honors
NASL MVP
 1974: Peter Silvester

NASL All-Stars
 1974: Geoff Butler, Peter Silvester

Indoor Soccer Hall of Fame members
 2019: Alan Mayer

See also
Baltimore Bays
Baltimore Bays (1972–73)
Baltimore Bays (1993–98)
Maryland Bays
Crystal Palace Baltimore

Notes

References

Defunct indoor soccer clubs in the United States
Defunct soccer clubs in Maryland
North American Soccer League (1968–1984) teams
Soccer clubs in Baltimore
1974 establishments in Maryland
1975 disestablishments in Maryland
Soccer clubs in Maryland
Association football clubs established in 1974
Association football clubs disestablished in 1975